Asghar Zoghian (7 November 1929 – 14 March 2005) was an Iranian wrestler. He competed in the men's Greco-Roman welterweight at the 1964 Summer Olympics.

References

External links
 

1929 births
2005 deaths
Iranian male sport wrestlers
Olympic wrestlers of Iran
Wrestlers at the 1964 Summer Olympics
Place of birth missing